Perello, Perellos, or Perelló may refer to:

People
 Andrés Perelló de Segurola (1874–1953), Spanish operatic bass
 Jaime Perelló (born 1973), Puerto Rican politician
 Joan Perelló (born 1993), Spanish motorcycle racer
 José Perelló Torrens (1885–1955), Spanish politician
 Marcel·lí Perelló i Domingo (1897–1961), Spanish guerrilla politician
 Marcelino Perelló Valls (1944–2017), Mexican student activist
 Melissa Perello (born 1976), American chef
 Raimundo Perellós, 15th-century nobleman of Aragon
 Ramon Perellos y Roccaful (1637–1720), Spanish Grand Master of the Order of Malta
 Rossend Perelló (1912–1976), Catalan writer

Places
 El Perelló, a municipality in Baix Ebre, Catalonia, Spain
 El Perelló, a municipality in Ribera Baixa, Valencia Province, Spain
 Perellos Redoubt, a 1716 fortification in St. Paul's Bay, Malta
 Perellos Tower, the second Marsalforn Tower in Xagħra, Gozo, Malta

See also
 Perella, a surname (including a list of people with that name)
 Opoul-Périllos, a commune in Pyrénées-Orientales, France